Cheap Eats is an original food travelogue television series on Cooking Channel where host and co-executive producer Ali Khan, author of the blog Bang for Your Burger Buck, has 12 hours to find the best deals  for breakfast, lunch, a snack, and dinner — on a budget of only $35. Sometimes Ali breaks the budget, but he only ever goes over by a few dollars.

Season 1

Season 2

References

Cooking Channel original programming